Council of People's Commissars on War and Navy Affairs (Soviet Narodnykh Kommissarov po voyenym i morskim dyelam) was the very first military government agency of the Soviet Russia initially named as the Committee on affairs of War and Navy. The council was created on November 8, 1917 (day after the October Revolution) on the decree of the 2nd All-Russian Congress of Soviets "On creation of the Provisional Workers' and Peasants' Government" which was the name of the Russian Sovnarkom.

The Kornilov Affair sanctioned by Alexander Kerensky which resulted in detention of the Russian Supreme Commander-in-Chief Lavr Kornilov and the Bolshevisation of Soviets also played a major role in establishing of the Soviet military presence. The council gradually overtook the authority of the Ministry of War of the Russian Republic completely changing the defense policy of Russia.

Historical background
Per decree "On creation of the Provisional Workers' and Peasants' Government" the committee was headed by a collegiate of the Petrograd Military Revolutionary Committee (Petrograd VRK) "Field Headquarters" (triumvirate) consisting of Vladimir Antonov-Ovseyenko, Pavel Dybenko and Nikolai Krylenko. Ovseyenko oversaw the Military ministry and internal front, Dybenko headed the Navy ministry, while Krylenko was put in charge of foreign front. However, on the next day the leadership was increased to 10 members, due to organizational complications. The same day (November 9, 1917) Vladimir Antonov-Ovseyenko was placed in charge of the Petrograd Military District replacing at that post Mikhail Artemyevich Muravyov. Together with Muravyov, Antonov was placed in charge of an expeditionary force to the Southern Russia, while the acting Supreme Commander-in-Chief was General Nikolay Dukhonin.

On November 15–16, 1917 new changes took place. The committee changed its name to the Council of People's Commissars on War and Navy Affairs. Originally it consisted of the college of war minister and a leader of revolutionary forces, while later a position of the Supreme Commander-in-Chief was created and by the end of November the Supreme Navy College was added to the council. On November 22, 1917 the Soviet government appointed its own Supreme Commander-in-Chief and overran the Main Headquarters of Supreme Commander-in-Chief (Stavka) in Mogilev when the acting Supreme Commander-in-Chief General Dukhonin was killed by enraged soldiers. The Military People's Commissariat was practically finalized and fully functional on December 10, 1917.

 College of War Minister - Nikolai Podvoisky
 Commander-in-Chief of revolutionary forces against - Vladimir Antonov-Ovseyenko
 Supreme Commander-in-Chief of Army and Fleet of the Russian Republic (November 22) - Nikolai Krylenko
 Supreme Navy College (formed on November 27) - Pavel Dybenko

Military revolutionary committees and Voyenka

Key role in establishing the Soviet military presence played military revolutionary committees (VRK) and the Communist Party military organization. The Soviet military majorly was based on its own military organizations of the RSDLP(b) headed by the Military organization at Central Committee, better known as Voyenka (abbreviation derived from Voyennaya Kommissiya). Upon acquiring a state power the leadership of the RSDLP(b) adopted a decision at the 7th Congress of the Russian Communist Party (Bolsheviks) on formally disbanding of its military organizations. The military organizations were used to established local military revolutionary committees throughout cities of the Russian Empire and along its frontlines. After establishing a Soviet power in the capital of Russia the council continued to rely on decisions Petrograd VRK leadership and encouraged creation of new military revolutionary committees throughout the former Russian Empire that played a key role in solidifying of the Soviet power. By the beginning of 1918 the number of military revolutionary committees jumped to 220. In the Soviet historiography the role of Petrograd VRK was depicted as a preventative against the counter-revolution (such as the Kerensky–Krasnov uprising) rather than an instigator of revolution.

List of Military Revolutionary Committees of Russia
 Petrograd VRK created on October 25, 1917 (existed until December 18, 1917)
 12th Army VRK (Cēsis) created on October 31, 1917 (famous Latvian Riflemen)
 Estland VRK created on November 4, 1917
 Northern front VRK created on November 4–5, 1917 (until November 8 - Pskov VRK)
 Moscow VRK created on November 7, 1917
 Voronezh revkom created on November 7, 1917
 Ryazan VRK created on November 8, 1917
 Western front and Northwestern region VRK (originally Minsk VRK) created on November 9, 1917
 Samara VRK created on November 9, 1917
 Tula revkom created on November 9, 1917
 Tom VRK created on November 10, 1917
 Smolensk revkom created on November 11, 1917
 Kiev VRK created on November 11, 1917
 Dagestan VRK created on November 21, 1917
 Orenburg VRK created on November 27, 1917
 Southwestern front VRK created on December 1, 1917
 Romanian front VRK created on December 15, 1917
 Barnaul VRK created on December 20, 1917
 Kharkov VRK created on December 23, 1917
 Yekaterinburg VRK
 Vinnytsia VRK 
 Odessa VRK
 Simferopol VRK
 Sevastopol revkom created on December 29, 1917
 Astrakhan revkom created in January 1918
 Caucasus Army VRK created on January 10, 1918
 Don VRK created on January 23, 1918
 Kuban-Black Sea VRK created on January 30, 1918
 Semirechye (Seven rivers) VRK created on March 2, 1918

References

External links
 Military Revolutionary Committee (Военно-революционные комитеты), Great Soviet Encyclopedia
 Revolutionary committees as an extraordinary bodies of the Soviet power (Революционные комитеты (чрезвычайные органы Сов. власти)). Great Soviet Encyclopedia.
 Borisov, V.A. Higher bodies of military power of the USSR in 1923 - 1991. "Legislation" magazine. 1996. (Высшие органы военного руководства СССР (1923 - 1991 гг.) [Журнал "Правоведение"/1996/№ 2])

Former defence ministries
Government of the Russian Soviet Federative Socialist Republic
Military history of Russia
1917 establishments in Russia